Samut Songkhram Football Club is a Thai professional football club based in Samut Songkhram. The club is currently playing in the Thai League 3 Western region.

The official team colours are light blue and white, and the nickname is Pla-Tu-Kha-Nong which Pla thu refers to the Shortbodied mackerel, and Kha-Nong is the Thai language meaning Rage. Another less common nickname is Mae Klong, referring to a river in western Thailand which flows in Samut Songkhram.

History
The team were founded in 2005 and joined the Thailand Provincial League, the club only needs one year to gain promotion to Thai Division 1 League by finishing runners-up in the league table in 2006.

In their first season of Thai Division 1 League, they finished runners-up in the league table group B and went to reach 4th place in final league table, and were promoted to Thailand's top flight the Thai Premier League.

The club finished 7th in their first season of top tier of the Thai football. In the following year they finished 10th.

In 2010 season, Samut Songkhram is sponsored by The Siam Cement Group (SCG). The club went on finishing the season at 8th place of the league table. SCG support the team until season 2011 after SCG left, financial problem happened with the club.

In 2018, Club-licensing of this team didn't pass to play 2018 Thai League 2. This team were relegated to 2018 Thai League 4 Western Region.

Stadium
Samut Songkhram Stadium is the home stadium of the club, the stadium holds 6,000 people.

Stadium and locations by season records

Season by season record

P = Played
W = Games won
D = Games drawn
L = Games lost
F = Goals for
A = Goals against
Pts = Points
Pos = Final position

TPL = Thai Premier League

QR1 = First Qualifying Round
QR2 = Second Qualifying Round
QR3 = Third Qualifying Round
QR4 = Fourth Qualifying Round
RInt = Intermediate Round
R1 = Round 1
R2 = Round 2
R3 = Round 3

R4 = Round 4
R5 = Round 5
R6 = Round 6
GR = Group stage
QF = Quarter-finals
SF = Semi-finals
RU = Runners-up
S = Shared
W = Winners

Players

Current squad

Club officials

Honours

Domestic leagues
Thai Division 1 League:
 Runners-up (1): 2007

References

 http://tl.smmonline.net/news/143077.html

External links

 
 Official Facebook

Association football clubs established in 2005
Football clubs in Thailand
Samut Songkhram province
2005 establishments in Thailand
Samutsongkhram F.C.